Thelenidia is a genus of lichenized fungi in the division Ascomycota. , it had not been placed into a specific family, class or class, and its relationship to other Ascomycota genera remains uncertain. A monotypic genus, it contains the single species Thelenidia monosporella.

References

External links 
 Index Fungorum

Lichen genera
Taxa named by William Nylander (botanist)
Taxa described in 1886